Kitsch painting is an international movement made up of classical painters, a result of a 24 September 1998 speech and philosophy given by the Norwegian figurative artist, Odd Nerdrum, later clarified in his book On Kitsch with Jan-Ove Tuv and others. The movement incorporates the techniques of the Old Masters with narrative, romanticism, and emotionally charged imagery. The movement defines Kitsch as synonymous with the arts of ancient Rome or the techne of ancient Greece. Kitsch painters embrace kitsch as a positive term not in opposition to "art", but as its own independent superstructure. Kitsch painters assert that Kitsch is not an art movement, but a philosophical movement separate from art. The Kitsch movement has been considered an indirect criticism of the contemporary art world, but according to Nerdrum, this is not the expressed intention.

Origins of kitsch painting philosophy
The philosophy originated by Nerdrum first manifested into a group among Nerdrum's circle of students Jan-Ove Tuv, Helene Knoop, Hege Elizabeth Haugen, Monika Helgesen, Jeremy Caniglia, Kjetil Jul, Brad Silverstein, Carlos Madrid, Stefan Boulter, Brandon Kralik, Nanne Nyander, and soon expanded. Many kitsch painters were featured in and contributed essays to Nerdrum's book Kitsch: More than Art

Collaborations
The Kitsch Movement has collaborated with The Florence Academy in a 2009 biennale exhibition titled "Immortal Works". a traveling exhibition which includes painters from around the world.

Exhibitions
2002 Kitsch Katakomben, Haugar Vestfold KunstMuseum, Tonsberg, Norway
2002 Raugland Atelier, Stavern, Norway
2002 Larvik Kunstforening, Larvik, Norway
2004 Kitsch, Telemark Museum, Skien, Norway
2005 Kitsch Annuale, Krutthuset, Fredricksvern Verft, Stavern, Norway
2006 Kitsch Annuale, Stavern, Norway
2008 Kitsch Biennale Pasinger Fabrik, Munich, Germany
2009 Kitsch, Krapperup Castle, Sweden
2009 Fall Kitsch, Galleri PAN, Oslo, Norway
2009 Immortal Works, VASA KONSTHALL, Gothenburg, Sweden
2010 Kitsch Biennale, Palazzo Cini, Venice, Italy

See also
 Aesthetics
 Classical Realism
 Empiricism
 Kitsch
 Metamodernism
 New Sincerity
 Objectivity (philosophy)
 Positivism
 Post-postmodernism
 Reconstructivism
 Stuckism

Notes

References

Further reading
 

Aesthetics
Philosophical schools and traditions
Art movements